Naresh Gehlot (born 24 December 1982) is an Indian first-class cricketer who represented Rajasthan. He made his first-class debut for Rajasthan in the 2004-05 Ranji Trophy on 16 November 2004.

References

External links
 

1982 births
Living people
Indian cricketers
Rajasthan cricketers